This is a list of municipalities of all types (including cities, towns, and villages) in the United States that lie in more than one county (or, in the case of Louisiana, in more than one parish). Counties are listed in descending order of the county's share of the municipal population per the 2000 census.

Alabama

Arizona

Arkansas

Colorado

Delaware

Florida

Georgia

Idaho

Illinois

Indiana

Iowa

Kansas

Kentucky

Louisiana

Maryland

Michigan

Minnesota

Mississippi

Missouri

Nebraska

New York

North Carolina

North Dakota

Ohio 
The following table does not include townships. Ohio is the only state that allows a township to exist in multiple counties, but a township is not considered a municipality. Examples of multi-county townships include Fairfield Township, Columbiana County, and Washington Township, Franklin County.

Oklahoma

Oregon

Pennsylvania

South Carolina

South Dakota

Tennessee

Texas

Utah

Virginia 
Virginia cities are all independent cities and are not located in any county, but several incorporated towns are located in multiple counties.

Washington

West Virginia

Wisconsin

Wyoming

References 

Multiple counties
Counties of the United States